Jackie Mason's Laughing Room Only is a 2003 Broadway musical with a book by Dennis Blair and Digby Wolfe and music and lyrics by Doug Katsaros. It began previews at the Brooks Atkinson Theatre on October 23, 2003, opened on November 19, 2003, and closed on November 30, 2003, totaling 14 performances. The show's story features the titular Jackie Mason as himself as he tries to put on a 10 million dollar musical on a budget of $19.99.

Other cast members were Ruth Gottschall, Cheryl Stern, Darrin Baker, Robert Creighton, and Barry Finkel. The show was directed by Robert Johanson.

Songs

Act l 

 Million Dollar Musical
 French Chanteuse
 This Jew Can Sing
 Frieda From Fresno
 Only in Manhattan
 Starbucks

Act ll 

 Comedy Ambulance
 Jackie's Signature Song
 I Need a Man
 Perfect
 Jew Gentile Tap-Off
 Tea Time
 Musical Chairs
 Finale

Reception 
Variety gave the show a mixed review, praising Mason's comedic talent while being less impressed with some of his reused material and the show's music.

References 

2003 musicals
Broadway musicals
Original musicals